L'Aquila Rugby 1936 was  an Italian rugby union club based in L'Aquila, the capital of Abruzzo.
The official colours of the club were black and green, the colours of the city of L'Aquila. The club went into liquidation and disbanded in 2018.

History
The roots of L'Aquila Rugby date back to the 1930s when, between 1936 and 1942, L'Aquila took part in tournaments organized by the Comandi Federali della GIL. It reached its peak in the 1937–38 season when, after Tommaso Fattori, a legendary figure for the history of the club (the stadium of L'Aquila, Stadio Tommaso Fattori is named after him), joined the team, the club won the local tournament qualifying for the final one, where it finished the season fourth out of 54 participants. It first played in a championship in 1948.

In 1949–50 L'Aquila participated in the Serie B and were in contention for promotion to Serie A up to the final game of the season, Genoa eventually winning out. The following year the team won promotion to the Serie A then the highest division in Italy. In 1958–59 they were losing finalists in the Serie A Grand Final. In 1963–64 they were relegated to Serie B, but returned to Serie A the following year. They won their first title in 1967 defeating Fiamme Oro Padova 6 to 0. Two years later they won their second title after having won 18 games out of 22 without losing a match.

The 1970s weren't a good decade for the Aquilani, as they won only one Italian Cup in 1973. In the 1980s they won two more titles in 1981 (league and cup double) and 1982. These were the years of Massimo Mascioletti (54 caps with the Italian national team), Serafino Ghizzoni (60 caps) and Luigi Troiani (47 caps). Then another period of not brilliant results followed, before they could celebrate their fifth title in 1993–94 after having defeated Milan 23–14 in the historical final in Padua. In 1999–2000 L'Aquila Rugby played another final for the Italian title, losing 35–17 against Roma in the match played in the Flaminio stadium.

In 2001–02 L'Aquila were part of the newly formed Super 10 (now Top12), where it is currently playing. During the past decades, L'Aquila has been one of the most important centre for Rugby in Italy, thanks to the passion and commitment of a lot of people from the city, who with the enthusiasm that had always accompanied them brought up several champions.

In 2009–10 L'Aquila were promoted back to the National Championship of Excellence, finishing 8th in this season.

Current squad
2014-15:

 International are capped in Bold

Honours
 National Championship of Excellence:
 Champions: 1967, 1969, 1981, 1982, 1994
 Coppa Italia:
 Champions: 1973, 1981
 Reserves Championship:
 Champions: 1967, 1970, 1973, 1975, 1985
 Under 19/20:
 Champions: 1950, 1960, 1965, 1966, 1979, 1981, 1995, 1997
 Under 17/18:
 Champions: 1977
 Coppa Primavera Under 17:
 Champions: 1967
 Under 15/16:
 Champions: 1977

Notable players
 Carlo Festuccia (Italy)
 Andrea Lo Cicero (Italy)
 Andrea Masi (Italy)
 Gert Peens (Italy)
 Luigi Troiani (Italy)
 Maurizio Zaffiri (Italy)
 Simon Picone (Italy)
 Rob Louw (South Africa)
 Joel Stransky (South Africa)
 Mike Brewer (New Zealand)
 Frano Botica (New Zealand)
 Loki Crichton (Samoa)

Statistics

European Challenge Cup

See also
 List of rugby union clubs in Italy
 Rugby union in Italy

References

External links
 Official site

Italian rugby union teams
L'Aquila
Sport in Abruzzo